Wiser.org, formerly WiserEarth.org, was a user-generated online community space for the social and environmental movement. As one of the social networks for environmental sustainability and social change, Wiser.org was the primary initiative of the non-profit organization WiserEarth, which tracks the work of non-profits around the world. The site mapped and connected non-governmental organizations (NGOs), businesses, governments, groups, and individuals addressing global issues such as climate change, poverty, the environment, peace, water, hunger, social justice, conservation, human rights, and more.

On 6 January 2014, Wiser.org's Executive Director, Peggy Duvette wrote an open letter to all members (which she updated on 24 January 2014) explaining the need for changes and the possibility of archiving the Wiser.org website to the Wayback Machine; and on 17 March 2014 she officially announced that the closure and archiving of the Wiser.org website would occur on 10 April 2014.

History
Wiser.org was launched as WiserEarth.org on Earth Day (April 22) 2007 as an online directory of the 100,000+ organizations touched upon in Paul Hawken's book, Blessed Unrest. Hawken had amassed a collection of business cards from thousands of organizations over the years, but had not found a comprehensive directory listing all non-profit organizations involved in the social justice and environmental sector.  Estimating the total number of non-profit organizations around the world to be well over a million, Hawken launched Wiser.org, which stands for the World Index for Social and Environmental Responsibility, as an online directory to help map out the work done by these organizations.  Wiser.org incorporated additional social networking features, such as status updates, likes, walls, groups, and email messaging to provide greater possibilities for collaboration.  Wiser.org expanded its organization directory to include listings of for-profit businesses and government agencies.

On 17 March 2014, it was announced on the Wiser.org website that it would be archived and shutdown on 10 April 2014.

In 2017, the domain WISER.org became the website for the Workie Institute for Social and Educational Research, a non-profit focusing on social exclusion, including bullying and systematic barriers to society, based on the work of the late Dr. Abaineh Workie.

Facts and figures
As of September 15, 2012, Wiser.org provided a directory of more than 114,000 organizations worldwide, over 71,900 registered members, and more than 2,800 groups. It featured resources and information on various social issues ranging from women's rights to climate change. These resources and information are organized into 47 distinct issue areas and 381 sub-issue areas. Wiser.org was available in English, Chinese (simplified), French, German, Indonesian, Italian, Portuguese, and Spanish.

Wiser.org Directory
The Wiser.org Directory was organized around a master list of issues which are "networked" in such a way that registered users could edit the "connections" of each issue to organizations, resources, jobs, events, and groups. The website featured groupware and social networking components including graphical "Network Maps". A unique "Solution form" allowed any logged in user to state a serious social or environmental problem and propose a way to solve it. The Solution then becomes a named entity that can be shared, modified, and acted upon as the proposed solution is implemented in the real world. The solution form included a place to record results and observations. Each Solution was provided with a publishing and networking page and a discussion forum. Wiser.org also incorporates embedded Google Maps integrated with the geographical data. The website was a non-profit venture and was free to the public. The data is published under a Creative Commons 3.0 license.

Wiser.org API
As of June 2009, Wiser.org offered a RESTful API developed under a Creative Commons 3.0 license. The Wiser.org API provides access to an extensive database of "entities" such as Organizations, Groups, Jobs, Events, Resources, and Solutions. There is an associated FAQ and a Developer's Documentation page.

Shutdown 
On 6 January 2014, Executive Director Peggy Duvette published an open letter on the website beginning "Dear Wiser.org Member," in which she wrote:

The letter was subsequently updated on 24 January 2014 to include a "More information about these changes...." section, which disclosed that the need for the changes is largely due to the ongoing cost of maintaining the organization's website, and upgrading it as will be needed.

On 17 March 2014, Duvette published another open letter to "Wiser.org friends, members and supporters," in which she wrote: "After many months of reflection and extensive feedback from Wiser.org members, editors and our board of directors, we have decided to close and archive the Wiser.org website. The archiving of the site will take place on April 10th 2014."  She continued:

She concluded with: "We trust that the members of the Wiser.org community will continue to create lasting impact across the many global and local networks that we are part of and through the wonderful organizations and communities we work with." Further information about what will happen to individual and group listings was provided.

For a time, the Wiser.org website contained the words "WiserEarth 2005-2014," as if on a tombstone, in the upper-left corner of the dark brown footer area of each of its website's pages; along with the words "Wiser.org is closing," followed by a "read more" link to the details, just beneath the header of its website's front page.

See also
 Blessed Unrest
 Care2
 Paul Hawken
 Earth Charter

References

American environmental websites
Social networks for social change
American social networking websites
Defunct websites